Mathai George Muthoot (4 February 1911 – 31 January 1993) was an Indian entrepreneur and businessman, prominent for his pioneering work in the South Indian financial sector.

He, along with his father N. Mathai Muthoot, founded what would later become the Muthoot Group of Companies.

Early life
M. George Muthoot was born to N. Mathai Muthoot on 4 February 1911 in Kozhencherry, a small town in South Kerala. N. Mathai Muthoot managed the family business of contract timber in the Kingdom of Travancore.

Meanwhile, M. George joined the Indian army. He was married to Ammini George Muthoot and had seven children (six sons and one daughter), who now manage the Muthoot Group.

Business career

After completing his army service, he returned to Kozhencherry in 1925 and established a new partnership firm along with his father (Muthoot Chit Fund), which was primarily a Chit Fund, and hence marking the foray of Muthoot into the financial sector.

The company started by M. George Muthoot came to be known as the Muthoot Group and is today among the largest and most respected companies in South India.
He and his son Dr. George Kurien were also instrumental in setting up a multi-specialty hospital in Kozhencherry (Muthoot Medical Center).

See also
 Kozhencherry
 Muthoot Family
 Muthoot Group
 M. G. George Muthoot
 George Alexander Muthoot

1911 births
1993 deaths
Businesspeople from Kerala